The Fox and the Hound is a 1981 American animated buddy drama film produced by Walt Disney Productions and loosely based on the 1967 novel of the same name by Daniel P. Mannix. The 24th Disney animated feature film, the film tells the story of the unlikely friendship between a red fox named Tod and a hound dog named Copper. The two friends struggle to preserve their friendship despite their emerging instincts and the surrounding social pressures demanding them to be adversaries, as they are enemies by nature. After Chief, Copper's mentor and guardian who is owned by the same hunter who owns Copper, is hit by a train while chasing Tod and seemingly almost dies, Copper assumes his role as a hunting dog and vows vengeance against Tod. Eventually, the two former friends fight each other, but in the end, Copper saves Tod after Tod saves Copper and his owner from a bear.

The film was directed by Ted Berman, Richard Rich, and Art Stevens, marking the directorial debuts of Berman and Rich. It was produced by Ron Miller, Wolfgang Reitherman, and Art Stevens. The ensemble voice cast consists of Mickey Rooney and Kurt Russell as Tod and Copper, respectively, with Pearl Bailey, Jack Albertson, Sandy Duncan, Jeanette Nolan, Pat Buttram, John Fiedler, John McIntire, Dick Bakalyan, Paul Winchell, Keith Mitchell, and Corey Feldman providing the voices of the other characters of the film. Mitchell and Feldman in particular voiced the young Tod and the young Copper. The instrumental musical score to the film was composed and conducted by Buddy Baker, with Walter Sheets performing the orchestration.

Walt Disney Productions first obtained the film rights to the novel by Daniel P. Mannix in 1967; however, actual development on the film would not occur until spring 1977. The Fox and the Hound marked the last involvement of the remaining members of Disney's Nine Old Men, which included Frank Thomas and Ollie Johnston. Though the old animators had involvement in early development of the film, the film was ultimately handed over to a new generation of animators following the retirement of the old animators. As such, it was the first film for future directors including Tim Burton, Brad Bird, and John Lasseter. During production, the film's release was delayed by over six months following the abrupt departure of Don Bluth and his team of animators. Further concerns were raised over the handling of the scene in which Chief is hit by a train, which was originally planned to result in Chief dying. After debating the handling of the scene, the filmmakers decided to change the death into a non-fatal injury by which he merely suffers a broken leg.

The Fox and the Hound was released to theaters on July 10, 1981, by Buena Vista Distribution. The film was a financial success, becoming the 14th highest-grossing film of the year and earning $39.9 million in the United States. However, it received mixed reviews from critics, who praised the animation and voice acting of the film, but believed that the film was not groundbreaking enough. It was nominated for three awards, of which it won one. At the time of its release, it was the most expensive animated film produced to date, costing $12 million. It was re-released to theaters on March 25, 1988. An intermediate follow-up, The Fox and the Hound 2, was released directly-to-DVD on December 12, 2006.

Plot

After a young red fox is orphaned, Big Mama the owl and her friends, Dinky the finch and Boomer the woodpecker, arrange for him to be adopted by kindly farmer Widow Tweed, who names him Tod. Meanwhile, her neighbor, hunter Amos Slade, brings home a young hound puppy named Copper and introduces him to his hunting dog Chief, who is at first annoyed by him, but then learns to love him. One day, Tod and Copper meet and become best friends, pledging eternal friendship. Amos grows frustrated at Copper for constantly wandering off to play, and places him on a leash. While playing with Copper outside his barrel, Tod accidentally awakens Chief. Amos and Chief chase Tod until they are stopped by Tweed. After an argument, Amos threatens to kill Tod if the fox trespasses on his farm again. Hunting season comes and Amos takes his dogs into the wilderness for the interim. Meanwhile, Big Mama, Dinky, and Boomer attempt to explain to Tod that Copper will soon become his enemy. However, Tod naively insists that he and Copper will remain friends forever.

The following spring, Tod and Copper reach adulthood. Copper returns as an expert hunting dog, who is expected to track down foxes. Late at night, Tod sneaks over to visit Copper. Their conversation awakens Chief, who alerts Amos. A chase ensues and Copper catches Tod, but lets Tod go while diverting Amos. Chief catches Tod as he attempts an escape on a railroad track, but an oncoming train strikes Chief, resulting in him falling into the river below and breaking his leg. Enraged by this, Copper and Amos blame Tod for the accident and vow vengeance. Realizing Tod is no longer safe with her, Tweed leaves him at a game reserve. After a disastrous night on his own in the woods, Big Mama introduces Tod to Vixey, a female fox who helps Tod adapt to life in the forest.

Amos and Copper trespass into the reserve and hunt the two foxes. The chase climaxes when Amos and Copper inadvertently provoke an attack from a giant bear. Amos trips and falls into one of his own traps, dropping his gun slightly out of reach. Copper violently fights the bear, but is almost killed by the vicious animal. Tod comes to Copper's rescue and battles the bear until they both fall down a waterfall. As Copper approaches Tod as he lies wounded in the lake below, Amos appears, ready to shoot Tod. Copper positions himself in front of Tod to prevent Amos from shooting him, refusing to move away. Amos, understanding Tod had saved their lives, lowers his gun and leaves with Copper. Tod and Copper reconcile their friendship and share one last smile before parting. At home, Tweed nurses Amos back to health, much to his humiliation. As he lies down to take a nap, Copper smiles as he remembers the day when he first met Tod. At the same moment, Vixey joins Tod on top of a hill as they both look down on Copper and Tod's former home.

Voice cast

 Mickey Rooney as Tod
 Keith Mitchell as Young Tod
 Kurt Russell as Copper
 Corey Feldman as Young Copper
 Pearl Bailey as Big Mama
 Jack Albertson as Amos Slade
 Sandy Duncan as Vixey
 Jeanette Nolan as Widow Tweed
 Pat Buttram as Chief
 John Fiedler as The Porcupine
 John McIntire as The Badger
 Dick Bakalyan as Dinky
 Paul Winchell as Boomer
 John Stephenson as Squeeks the Caterpillar (uncredited)

Production

Development
In May 1967, shortly before The Fox and the Hound won the Dutton Animal Book Award, it was reported that Walt Disney Productions had obtained the film rights to the novel. In spring 1977, development began on the project after Wolfgang Reitherman had read the original novel and decided that it would make for a good animated feature as one of his sons had once owned a pet fox years before. The title was initially reported as The Fox and the Hounds, but the filmmakers dropped the plural as the story began to focus more and more on the two leads. Reitherman was the film's original director along with Art Stevens as co-director. A power struggle between the two directors and co-producer Ron Miller broke out over key sections of the film with Miller supporting the younger Stevens. Miller instructed Reitherman to surrender reins over to the junior personnel, but Reitherman resisted due to a lack of trust in the young animators.

In an earlier version of the film, Chief was slated to die as he did in the novel. However, the scene was modified to have Chief survive with a cast on his back paw. Animator Ron Clements, who had briefly transitioned into the story department, protested: "Chief has to die. The picture doesn't work if he just breaks his leg. Copper doesn't have motivation to hate the fox." Likewise, younger members of the story team pleaded with Stevens to have Chief killed. Stevens countered, "Geez, we never killed a main character in a Disney film and we're not starting now!" The younger crew members took the problem to upper management, who would also back Stevens. Ollie Johnston's test animation of Chief stomping around the house with his leg in a cast was eventually kept, and Randy Cartwright re-animated the scene where Copper finds Chief's body and had him animate Chief's eyes opening and closing so the audience knew that he was not dead.

Another fight erupted when Reitherman, in thinking the film lacked a strong second act, decided to add a musical sequence of two swooping cranes voiced by Phil Harris and Charo. These characters would sing a silly song titled "Scoobie-Doobie Doobie Doo, Let Your Body Turn to Goo" to Tod after he was dropped in the forest. Charo had recorded the song and several voice tracks which were storyboarded, and live-action reference footage was shot of her wearing a sweaty pink leotard. However, the scene was strongly disliked by studio personnel who felt the song was a distraction from the main plot, with Stevens stating "We can't let that sequence in the movie! It's totally out of place!" Stevens notified studio management and after many story conferences, the scene was removed. Reitherman later walked into Stevens's office, slumped in a chair, and said, "I dunno, Art, maybe this is a young man's medium." He later moved on to undeveloped projects such as Catfish Bend.

Animation

By late 1978, Frank Thomas, Ollie Johnston, and Cliff Nordberg had completed their animation. Thomas had animated scenes of Tod and Copper using dialogue Larry Clemmons had written and recorded with the child actors. This project would mark the last film to have the involvement of Disney's Nine Old Men who had retired early during production, and animation was turned over to the next generation of directors and animators, which included John Lasseter, John Musker, Ron Clements, Glen Keane, Tim Burton, Brad Bird, Henry Selick, Chris Buck, Mike Gabriel, and Mark Dindal, all of whom would finalize the animation and complete the film's production. These animators had moved through the in-house animation training program, and would play an important role in the Disney Renaissance of the 1980s and 1990s.

However, the transition between the old guard and the new resulted in arguments over how to handle the film. Reitherman had his own ideas on the designs and layouts that should be used, but the newer team backed Stevens. Animator Don Bluth animated several scenes including of Widow Tweed milking her cow, Abigail, while his team worked on the rest of the sequence, and when Tweed fires at Amos Slade's automobile. Nevertheless, Bluth and the new animators felt that Reitherman was too stern and out of touch, and on his 42nd birthday, September 13, 1979, Bluth, along with Gary Goldman and John Pomeroy, entered Ron Miller's office, and they turned in their resignations. Soon after, 13 more animators followed suit in turning in their resignations. Though Bluth and his team had animated substantial scenes, they asked not to receive screen credit.

With those animators now gone, Miller ordered all of the resigning animators off the studio lot by noon of that same day and would later push the release of The Fox and the Hound from Christmas 1980 to summer 1981. New animators were hired and promoted to fill the ranks. To compensate for the lack of experience of the new animators, much of the quality control would rely upon a network of veteran assistant animators. Four years after production started, the film was finished with approximately 360,000 drawings, 110,000 painted cels and 1,100 painted backgrounds making up the finished product. A total of 180 people, including 24 animators, worked on the film.

Casting
Early into production, the principal characters such as young Tod and Copper, Big Mama, and Amos Slade had already been cast. The supporting characters were cast by Disney voice regulars including Pat Buttram for Chief, Paul Winchell for Boomer, and Mickey Rooney, who had just finished filming Pete's Dragon (1977), for adult Tod. Jeanette Nolan was the second choice for Widow Tweed after Helen Hayes turned down the part. The last role to be cast was for adult Copper. Jackie Cooper had auditioned for the role, but left the project when he demanded more money than the studio was willing to pay. While filming the Elvis (1979) television film, former Disney young actor Kurt Russell was cast following a reading that had impressed the filmmakers, and completed his dialogue in two recording sessions. The growling vocals for the bear were provided by sound effects artist Jimmy MacDonald.

Soundtrack

The soundtrack album for the film was released in 1981 by Disneyland Records. It contains songs written by Stan Fidel, Jim Stafford, and Jeffrey Patch.

Track listing

Release

Box office
In its original release, The Fox and the Hound grossed $39.9 million in domestic grosses, the highest for an animated film at the time from its initial release. Its distributor rentals were reported to be $14.2 million while its international rentals totaled $43 million. The film was re-released theatrically on March 25, 1988, where it grossed $23.5 million. The Fox and the Hound has had a lifetime gross of $63.5 million across its original release and reissue.

Home media
The Fox and the Hound was first released on VHS on March 4, 1994, as the last entry in the Walt Disney Classics line. This release was placed into moratorium on April 30, 1995. On May 2, 2000, it was released on Region 1 DVD for the first time as part of the Walt Disney Gold Classic Collection line, along with a simultaneous VHS re-issue as part of the same video line on the same day. This edition went into moratorium in January 2006. Soon after, a 25th anniversary special edition DVD was released on October 10, 2006.

The Fox and the Hound was released on Blu-ray on August 9, 2011, commemorating the film's 30th anniversary as part of a 3-disc Blu-ray/DVD Combo pack that was bundled as a 2-movie Collection Edition featuring The Fox and the Hound 2 on the same Blu-ray Disc, as well as separate DVD versions of both films. Featuring a new digital restoration, the Blu-ray transfer presents the film for the first time in 1.66:1 widescreen and also features 5.1 DTS-HD Master Audio. The Fox and the Hound 2 is presented in 1.78:1 widescreen and features the same audio channel as the first film. A DVD-only edition of the 2-movie Collection, again featuring both films on separate discs, was also released on the same day.

Critical reception

Initial reviews
Vincent Canby of The New York Times claimed that the film "breaks no new ground whatsoever", while describing it as "a pretty, relentlessly cheery, old-fashioned sort of Disney cartoon feature, chock-full of bouncy songs of an upbeatness that is stickier than Krazy-Glue and played by animals more anthropomorphic than the humans that occasionally appear." He further commented that the film "is rather overstuffed with whimsy and folksy dialogue. It also possesses a climax that could very well scare the daylights out of the smaller tykes in the audience, though all ends well. Parents who don't relish chaperoning their tykes to see the movie, but find they must anyway, can take heart in the knowledge that the running time is 83 minutes. That's about as short as you can get these days." Sheila Benson of the Los Angeles Times praised the animation, but criticized the story for playing it too safe. She acknowledged that the writers were "protecting us from important stuff: from rage, from pain, from loss. By these lies, done for our own good, of course, they also limit the growth that is possible." David Ansen of Newsweek stated that "Adults may wince at some of the sticky-sweet songs, but the movie is not intended for grownups."

Richard Corliss of Time magazine praised the film for its intelligent story about prejudice. He argued that the film shows that biased attitudes can poison even the deepest relationships, and the film's bittersweet ending delivers a powerful and important moral message to audiences. Roger Ebert of the Chicago Sun-Times also praised the film, saying that "for all of its familiar qualities, this movie marks something of a departure for the Disney studio, and its movement is in an interesting direction. The Fox and the Hound is one of those relatively rare Disney animated features that contains a useful lesson for its younger audiences. It's not just cute animals and frightening adventures and a happy ending; it's also a rather thoughtful meditation on how society determines our behavior."

Retrospective reviews
TV Guide gave the film four out of five stars, saying that "The animation here is better than average (veteran Disney animators Wolfgang Reitherman and Art Stevens supervised the talents of a new crop of artists that developed during a 10-year program at the studio), though not quite up to the quality of Disney Studios in its heyday. Still, this film has a lot of 'heart' and is wonderful entertainment for both kids and their parents. Listen for a number of favorites among the voices." Michael Scheinfeld of Common Sense Media gave the film's quality a rating of 4 out of 5 stars, stating that the film "develops into a thoughtful examination of friendship and includes some mature themes, especially loss."

In The Animated Movie Guide, Jerry Beck considered the film "average", though he praises the voice work of Pearl Bailey as Big Mama, and the extreme dedication to detail shown by animator Glen Keane in crafting the fight scene between Copper, Tod, and the bear. In his book The Disney Films, Leonard Maltin also notes that the fight scene between Copper, Tod, and the bear received great praise in the animation world. However, Maltin felt the film relied too much on "formula cuteness, formula comedy relief, and even formula characterizations". Overall, he considered the film "charming" stating that it is "warm, and brimming with personable characters" and that it "approaches the old Disney magic at times." Craig Butler from All Movie Guide stated that the film was a "warm and amusing, if slightly dull, entry in the Disney animated canon." He also called it "conventional and generally predictable" with problems in pacing. However, he praised the film's climax and animation, as well as the ending. His final remark is that "Two of the directors, Richard Rich and Ted Berman, would next direct The Black Cauldron, a less successful but more ambitious project."

Rob Humanick of Slant Magazine gave the film 3 out of five stars, noting that it was the transition point between the remaining original animators since Snow White and the Seven Dwarfs to the new generation, saying that "the results culled the best qualities of both groups." and that "The result is a work of both learned, assured poise and triumphant freshman determination, not far away (in style or quality) from other benchmark-status works, like the aforementioned Snow White or Pixar’s Toy Story." RL Shaffer of IGN wrote a rather mixed review, claiming that the film "is just not as impressive as Disney's early work, or their late '80s/early '90s pictures." James Kendrick of Q Network Film Desk stated that the film "is not one of the studio's best efforts, but nonetheless it remains a fascinating product of an era of upheaval as well as a meaningful statement about the nature of prejudice." Peter Canavense of Groucho Reviews stated that the film is "sweet but a bit dull", nothing that "Overall, the picture is good-hearted and colorful, with an ending that carries a nice touch of ambiguity about the tussle of nature and nurture." John J. Puccio of Movie Metropolis claimed that the film is "very sweet and no doubt a delight for children, but I found it quite slow and tedious."

The review aggregator website Rotten Tomatoes reported that the film received  approval rating with an average rating of  based on  reviews. The website's consensus states that "The Fox and the Hound is a likeable, charming, unassuming effort that manages to transcend its thin, predictable plot." Metacritic gave the film a score of 65 based on 15 reviews, indicating "generally favorable reviews".

Accolades
The film was awarded a Golden Screen Award in 1982. In the same year, it was also nominated for a Young Artist Award and the Saturn Award for Best Fantasy Film.

Comic adaptations
As well as adaptations of the film itself, comic strips featuring the characters also appeared in stories unconnected to the film. Examples include The Lost Fawn, in which Copper uses his sense of smell to help Tod find a fawn who has gone astray; The Chase, in which Copper must safeguard a sleepwalking Chief; and Feathered Friends, in which the birds Dinky and Boomer must go to desperate lengths to save one of Widow Tweed's chickens from a wolf.

A comic adaptation of the film, drawn by Richard Moore, was published in newspapers as part of Disney's Treasury of Classic Tales. A comic-book titled The Fox and the Hound followed, with new adventures of the characters. From 1981 to 2007, a few Fox and the Hound Disney comics stories were produced in Italy, Netherlands, Brazil, France, and the United States.

Follow-up

An intermediate follow-up, The Fox and the Hound 2, was released directly-to-DVD on December 12, 2006. The follow-up takes place during the youth of Tod and Copper, before the events of the later half of the first film. The story-line of the follow-up involves Copper being tempted to join a band of singing stray dogs called "The Singin' Strays", thus threatening his friendship with Tod. The follow-up was critically panned, with critics calling it a pale imitation of its predecessor.

See also
 The Belstone Fox, a 1973 British film with similar themes, based on David Rook's 1970 novel, The Ballad of the Belstone Fox

Notes

References

Bibliography

External links

 
 
 
 
 
 
 

1981 films
1981 animated films
1980s American animated films
1980s buddy drama films
1980s children's animated films
1980s coming-of-age drama films
1980s English-language films
1981 directorial debut films
1981 drama films
American buddy drama films
American children's animated drama films
American coming-of-age drama films
Animated buddy films
Animated coming-of-age films
Animated drama films
Animated films about dogs
Animated films about foxes
Animated films about orphans
Animated films based on novels
Films about prejudice
Films adapted into comics
Films based on American novels
Films directed by Art Stevens
Films directed by Richard Rich
Films directed by Ted Berman
Films produced by Ron W. Miller
Films scored by Buddy Baker (composer)
Films set on farms
Films set in North America
Walt Disney Animation Studios films
Walt Disney Pictures animated films
Films with screenplays by Burny Mattinson